Schroen is a surname. Notable people with the surname include:

 Francis C. Schroen (1857–1924), Jesuit interior designer and painter
 Gary Schroen (1941–2022), CIA officer

See also
 Schrøen